Louise Fitzhugh (October 5, 1928 – November 19, 1974) was an American writer and illustrator of children's books, known best for the novel Harriet the Spy and its sequels, The Long Secret and Sport.

Biography

Early life

Fitzhugh was born in Memphis, Tennessee, to wealthy parents in 1928. Her parents divorced when she was an infant and her father, Millsaps Fitzhugh, gained custody; she lived with him in the South. She attended Miss Hutchison's School and three different universities. She lived in Washington, DC, France, and Italy.

She attended Bard College where she became involved in politics and antiracism. She studied art in Italy and France, and continued her studies at the Art Students League and the Cooper Union.  She lived most of her adult life in New York City and had houses in both Long Island and Bridgewater, Connecticut.

Career

Fitzhugh was the illustrator of the 1961 children's book Suzuki Beane, a parody of Eloise; while Eloise lived in the Plaza, Suzuki was the daughter of beatnik parents and slept on a mattress on the floor of a Bleecker Street pad in Greenwich Village. Fitzhugh worked closely with author Sandra Scoppettone to produce Suzuki Beane, which incorporated typewriter font and line drawings in an original way. Although a parody of both Eloise and beatnik conceit, the book sprang to life as a genuine work of literature. Today, it is much sought-after on used-book websites.

Fitzhugh's best-known book was Harriet the Spy, published in 1964 to some controversy, since so many characters were far from admirable. It has since become a classic. According to her New York Times obituary, published November 19, 1974: "The book helped introduce a new realism to children's fiction and has been widely imitated". Harriet is the daughter of affluent New Yorkers who leave her in the care of her nanny, Ole Golly, in their Manhattan townhouse. She wrote two other books in the same universe, The Long Secret and Sport.

Fitzhugh, like many of Harriet's fans, was a lesbian. "Although Harriet's sexuality is never touched on in the book, her boy's clothes and bravado sent a message to some kids who felt different and didn't know why." Another young adult manuscript, Amelia, concerned two girls falling in love. This manuscript was not published and was later lost.

Fitzhugh illustrated many of her books and had works exhibited in Banfer Gallery, New York, in 1963, among many other galleries.

Her 1974 novel Nobody's Family is Going to Change was adapted into the 1983 Tony-nominated musical The Tap Dance Kid.

Death

Fitzhugh died in 1974 of a brain aneurysm, eight days before the publication of Nobody's Family Is Going to Change. Her obituary was published in The New York Times.

Works

Novels
 Harriet the Spy (Harper & Row, 1964)
 The Long Secret (Harper & Row, 1965) – sequel to Harriet the Spy
 Nobody's Family Is Going to Change (Farrar, Straus and Giroux, 1974), 
 Sport (Delacorte, 1979) – posthumously published quasi-sequel to Harriet,

Children's books
 Bang, Bang, You're Dead, (co-written with Sandra Scoppettone), illus. Fitzhugh (Harper & Row, 1969), 
 I Am Five, written and illus. by Fitzhugh (Delacorte Press, 1978), 
 I Am Four, illus. Susan Bonners (Delacorte, 1982), 
 I Am Three, illus. Susanna Natti (Delacorte, 1982),

As illustrator only
 Suzuki Beane, written by Sandra Scoppettone, (Doubleday, 1961),

Awards

 New York Times Outstanding Books of the Year citation, 1964
 Oklahoma Sequoyah Book Award, 1967 (Harriet the Spy)
Posthumous
Children's Book Bulletin, 1976 (Nobody's Family is Going to Change)
Children's Workshop Other Award, 1976 (Nobody's Family is Going to Change)
Emmy Award for children's entertainment special (The Tap Dance Kid, based on Nobody's Family is Going to Change).

References

Further reading

External links

Grant, Neva. "Unapologetically Harriet, the Misfit Spy." NPR, March 3, 2008.
Bard College. "Women Arrive." (Photograph 5 shows Fitzhugh as a model for a painting c.1949.)
 

1928 births
1974 deaths
American children's writers
American women illustrators
American illustrators
20th-century American novelists
American lesbian writers
Writers from Memphis, Tennessee
Novelists from Tennessee
Writers from New York City
American young adult novelists
American women novelists
American LGBT novelists
LGBT people from Tennessee
American women children's writers
20th-century American women writers
20th-century American women artists
Women writers of young adult literature
Deaths from intracranial aneurysm
Novelists from New York (state)
Writers who illustrated their own writing
20th-century American LGBT people